Văn Tiến Dũng (2 May 1917 – 17 March 2002), born Co Nhue commune, Từ Liêm District, Hanoi, was a Vietnamese general in the People's Army of Vietnam (PAVN), PAVN chief of staff (1954–74); PAVN commander in chief (1974–80); member of the Central Military–Party Committee (CMPC) (1984–86) and Socialist Republic of Vietnam defense minister (1980–87).

Military career
Văn Tiến Dũng joined the Communist Party of Vietnam in 1936, he escaped from a French prison in 1944, and fought against the Japanese occupation force during the Second World War. August 1945, he directed the armed forces to seize power in the province of Hòa Bình, Ninh Bình and Thanh Hóa. By October 1953 during the First Indochina War, Dũng rose to become Chief of Staff of the Vietnam People's Army under General Võ Nguyên Giáp prior to the siege of Điện Biên Phủ in 1954. For the next twenty years, his military reputation in North Vietnam was second only to Giáp's. 

He commanded the vital Tri-Thien-Hue Front during the 1972 Easter Offensive, replacing his mentor as PAVN commander in chief in 1974, when the Vietnam War against the Americans and South Vietnamese evolved from a guerrilla struggle to more conventional forms.

Dũng planned and commanded the 1975 spring offensive, the final PAVN offensive that defeated South Vietnamese defenses and captured Saigon in 1975. He also directed Vietnam's invasion of Khmer Rouge Cambodia and the resulting border conflict with the People's Republic of China in 1979. He was appointed defence minister in 1980. He retired in December 1986 at the 6th National Congress of the Communist Party of Vietnam.

Văn Tiến Dũng died on 17 March 2002 in Hanoi, at the age of 84.

References

Notes

Sources
 Van Tien Dung, Our Great Spring Victory: An Account of the Liberation of South Vietnam. Trans. by John Spragens, Jr. New York: Monthly Review Press, 1977.
 Tobin, Thomas G., Arthur E. Laehr, and John F. Hilgenberg, Last Flight from Saigon. Maxwell Air Force Base AL: Air University Press, 1979.
 Nguyen Duy Hinh, Major General, Vietnamization and the Cease-Fire. Washington, D.C.: United States Army Center of Military History, 1980.
 
 Cao Văn Viên, General, The Final Collapse. Washington, D.C.: United States Army Center of Military History, 1983.

External links

 Interview with Van Tien Dung, 1981
 Bibliography: Văn Tiến Dũng's writings
 CBS News report of World Airways evacuation flight from Da Nang
 Timeline of NVA invasion of South Vietnam
 “The Trials of Henry Kissinger” documentary by Eugene Jarecki (video, 1h19). Sequence on Nixon campaign sabotage of Paris Peace Accords: start 15min 20sec – end 20min 10sec.
 Tran Van Tra, Vietnam: History of the Bulwark B2 Theater, vol. 5, Concluding the 30-Year War. Ho Chi Minh City: Van Nghe Publishing, 1982. On-line edition
 The Fall of the Khmer Rouge
 1979: Vietnam forces Khmer Rouge retreat
 Meanwhile: When the Khmer Rouge came to kill in Vietnam
 Second Life, Second Death: The Khmer Rouge After 1978
 Ministry of Defence Vietnam

1917 births
2002 deaths
People from Hanoi
Generals of the People's Army of Vietnam
North Vietnamese military personnel of the Vietnam War
Government ministers of Vietnam
Alternates of the 3rd Politburo of the Workers' Party of Vietnam
Members of the 3rd Politburo of the Workers' Party of Vietnam
Members of the 4th Politburo of the Communist Party of Vietnam
Members of the 5th Politburo of the Communist Party of Vietnam
Alternates of the 2nd Central Committee of the Workers' Party of Vietnam
Members of the 3rd Central Committee of the Workers' Party of Vietnam
Members of the 4th Central Committee of the Communist Party of Vietnam
Members of the 5th Central Committee of the Communist Party of Vietnam
Members of the 6th Central Committee of the Communist Party of Vietnam
Ministers of Defence of Vietnam